is a Japanese gravure idol and actress who has appeared in a number of television programmes, stage productions, feature films and videos. She is represented with the agency Asche.

Biography
In 2009, she won the semi-Grand Prix and Photogenic Award at "Miss Mobage Grand Prix '09". She served as image girl of Heiwa Corporation in 2013. In addition, she served as the 5th generation advertising ambassador of Sagami Original 002.

In April 2017,  she published her first photo collection "Trente".

Filmography

Television

Dramas

Radio

Direct-to-video

Stage

Advertisements

Films

Release works

DVD

Photo albums

See also
Tarento
Gravure idol

References

External links
 
 
 
 

Japanese gravure idols
Japanese actresses
Japanese television personalities
Musicians from Tokyo
1987 births
Living people
Ebisu Muscats